Erbium(III) iodide is an iodide of lanthanide metal erbium. The compound is insoluble in water and is white to slightly pink in appearance. The chemical can be produced by the reaction of elemental iodine and finely divided erbium by the following equation: 

2Er + 3I_2\longrightarrow 2ErI_3

References

Erbium compounds
Iodides
Lanthanide halides